The 2008–09 FC Argeș Pitești season was the 44th season of FC Argeș Pitești in the Liga I, the top division in Romanian football.

The team finished the league in 10th position but was relegated due to allegations of referee bribery.

Squad 2008–09

Appearances and goals

As of October 8, 2008

|}

Disciplinary record
 Disciplinary records for 2008–09 league and cup matches. Players with 1 card or more included only.
 Last updated on October 8, 2008.

Competitions

Liga I

League table

Results summary

Results by round

Matches

Cupa României

References

FC Argeș Pitești seasons
Arges Pitesti